Marcela Krůzová is a retired Czech football striker, who played for Slavia Prague in the Czech First Division.

She is a member of the Czech national team since 2010.

References

1990 births
Living people
Czech women's footballers
Czech Republic women's international footballers
People from Trutnov
Women's association football forwards
SK Slavia Praha (women) players
Czech Women's First League players
Sportspeople from the Hradec Králové Region